Integrated Personnel and Pay System-Army (IPPS-A) is a United States Army acquisition program that seeks to integrate human resources and pay for all Army Soldiers. It is provides online tools and replaces older Army human resource systems. It also provides talent management capabilities and is essential to the Army's People Strategy. IPPS-A provides three main capabilities: Total Force Visibility, Talent Management and the ability to successfully complete audits. It has successfully fielded to the Army National Guard (ARNG) and was scheduled to field to the active and reserve components by December 2021.

On 17 January 2023 IPPS-A Release 3 is now available to Soldiers in all three components — Active Army, Reserve, and National Guard.
For example, a Soldier can show a Self-professed Talent to the Army, using the "TAM Soldier Workplace" tile in Release 3 IPPS-A; This would then show up in the "Soldier Talent Profile".

Fielding was delayed in October 2021 during the system acceptance test; issues with importing data from existing personnel systems have delayed the live transfer of action requests to, or from, IPPS-A until September 2022. The 20 September 2022 cutover to IPPS-A was delayed, as data from legacy Recruiting software and data to Defense Manpower Data Center software was not yet stable.
New equipment training (NET)
IPPS-A is accessible via one's smartphone.

Connecting data from, or to existing personnel systems
 As of 23 January 2023 TRICARE coverage of 17,110 soldiers and 8,000 family members was restored, except for 25 Soldiers. Coverage had been interrupted during the GoLive event one week earlier.

Form DD214 and the Transition Processing System are a work in process for the week from  23 to 30 January 2023; discharge forms and separation orders required to get access to Veterans Affairs disability pay, retirement pensions, the G.I. Bill, etc. are unavailable for this period.
ARNG pay issues

IPPS-A action requests

Organization 
The IPPS-A implementation is a partnership between the Assistant Secretary of the Army for Acquisition, Logistics, and Technology and the Army G-1 with Program Executive Office Enterprise Information Systems and Technology and Business Architecture Integration.

Army Reserve (USAR)

Active Army

A uniform payday schedule
Previous Army payroll software allowed soldiers to select either a monthly payday, or a semimonthly payday. As part of IPPS-A, on 1 October 2022 the Army switches to a semimonthly payday, on the 15th and on the last day of each month, for long-term active-duty Soldiers.

See also
Defense Finance and Accounting Service (DFAS) — for both military members and retirees

References

United States Army